East Oder is the eastern arm of the lower Oder near Szczecin, Poland. It flows through Skośnica canal into West Oder and through Regalica into Dąbie Lake in the delta of the Oder river.

The river flows through the Lower Oder Valley forming, along with the Western Oder, an area called Międzyodrze, part of the Lower Odra Valley Landscape Park. Międzyodrze area is traversed by a network of canals and old riverbeds, linked with East Oder. Between the split of Odra arms to the Regalica, East Oder runs through the Gryfino County.

See also
West Oder

References
 Opis Odrzańskiej Drogi Wodnej Zawartej w granicach RZGW Szczecin. Regionalny Zarząd Gospodarki Wodnej w Szczecinie.

Rivers of Poland
Rivers of West Pomeranian Voivodeship
0East Oder